The Scarlet Letter is an opera by Walter Damrosch, based on Nathaniel Hawthorne's 1850 novel of the same name. The libretto was by George Parsons Lathrop, son-in-law of the author. The work is Wagnerian in style, Damrosch being a great enthusiast and champion of the composer. Among those present at the premiere were Charles Eliot Norton, Prince Serge Wolkonsky, Julia Ward Howe, and Nellie Melba.

Roles

Differences from the novel
Pearl, Hester's daughter, is absent.
Instead of living a solitary life after Dimmesdale dies at the end, Hester takes poison and dies with him.

References

External links
Libretto

1896 operas
Operas by Walter Damrosch
Operas set in the United States
English-language operas
Operas based on novels
Operas
Works based on The Scarlet Letter
Adultery in theatre